Sunwood Lake is an artificial lake in the U.S. state of Washington.

Sunwood Lake was created and named upon the creation of the adjacent planned community. The lake is privately owned.

References

Lakes of Thurston County, Washington